Tommy Fury (born 7 May 1999) is a British professional boxer and reality television personality. He took time off from his boxing career in 2019 to star in the fifth series of the ITV2 dating reality television show Love Island. Along with partner Molly-Mae Hague the couple finished as runners-up of the series. He is the younger half-brother of heavyweight world champion of boxing, Tyson Fury.

Early life 
Fury was born on 7 May 1999 in Manchester, England. His father, John Fury, is of Irish Traveller descent and his mother is of Mauritian descent. His half-brother is world heavyweight champion Tyson Fury.

Boxing career
Fury made his professional debut against Jevgenijs Andrejevs (10–102–3) on 22 December 2018 at the Manchester Arena, Manchester, scoring a four-round points decision (PTS) victory (40–36). The fight was part of the undercard of the Josh Warrington vs. Carl Frampton featherweight world title fight. In his second fight he recorded the first stoppage of his professional career, defeating Callum Ide (0–26–2) via first-round knockout (KO) on 23 March 2019.

After stepping away from boxing for nine months to take part in a reality television programme, Fury returned to the ring on 21 December 2019, scoring a first-round technical knockout (TKO) victory over Przemyslaw Binienda (2–26) at the Copper Box Arena in London. The fight was televised live on BT Sport.

On 13 November 2020, Tommy Fury recorded his fourth straight win, against Genadij Krajevskij (0–12). Both fighters were trading shots in the first round, but it was in the second round that Fury started landing clean shots. The fight ended in the second round, after Fury knocked Krajevskij out with a big uppercut. Fury improved to 6–0 with a points victory over Jordan Grant on 5 June 2021.

On 29 August 2021, Fury made his US debut on the undercard of Jake Paul vs. Tyron Woodley. He defeated Anthony Taylor (0–1) by unanimous decision with 40–36 on all three judges' scorecards.

Fury vs. Paul

Fury was scheduled to face YouTuber-turned-boxer Jake Paul on 18 December 2021. However, Fury pulled out of the bout due to a bacterial chest infection and a broken rib. He next returned to the ring on the undercard of his brother Tyson Fury's WBC and The Ring title fight against Dillian Whyte on 23 April 2022 at Wembley Stadium in London, in which he defeated Daniel Bocianski on points. After defeating Bocianski, Fury called out Jake Paul.

A fight between Fury and Paul was rescheduled for 6 August at Madison Square Garden, however, Fury was forced to pull out after being denied entry into the United States.

In January 2023 it was announced the fight had been rescheduled for 26 February in Diriyah, Saudi Arabia. Fury handed Paul his first loss, defeating him via split decision. One judge scored the fight 75–74 to Paul, while other two judges scored it 76–73 to Fury. With the victory he was awarded the commemorative WBC Diriyah Belt and a spot in the organisation's cruiserweight rankings.

Love Island
In June 2019, he took part in the fifth series of the ITV2 dating reality show Love Island, finishing as a runner-up alongside girlfriend Molly-Mae Hague. Their daughter was born on 23 January 2023. In December 2019, Fury appeared in a TV series alongside fellow Love Island contestant Curtis Pritchard called The Boxer and The Ballroom Dance on ITV2 whereby they swapped careers, so Fury trying ballroom dancing and Pritchard taking up boxing.

Boxing record

Professional

Exhibition

Pay-per-view bouts

References

External links 

1999 births
English male boxers
English people of Irish descent
English people of Mauritian descent
Irish Travellers from England
Irish Traveller sportspeople
Light-heavyweight boxers
Living people
Boxers from Manchester
Fury family
Love Island (2015 TV series) contestants